Autophagy-related protein 10 is a protein that in humans is encoded by the ATG10 gene.

References

External links

Further reading